In recreational mathematics, a Keith number or repfigit number (short for repetitive Fibonacci-like digit) is a natural number  in a given number base  with  digits such that when a sequence is created such that the first  terms are the  digits of  and each subsequent term is the sum of the previous  terms,  is part of the sequence. Keith numbers were introduced by Mike Keith in 1987.
They are computationally very challenging to find, with only about 100 known.

Definition 

We define the sequence  by a linear recurrence relation. For , 

and for 

If there exists an  such that , then  is said to be a Keith number. 

For example, 88 is a Keith number in base 6, as 

and the entire sequence

Finding Keith numbers
Whether or not there are infinitely many Keith numbers in a particular base  is currently a matter of speculation. Keith numbers are rare and hard to find. They can be found by exhaustive search, and no more efficient algorithm is known.
According to Keith, in base 10, on average  Keith numbers are expected between successive powers of 10. Known results seem to support this.

Examples
14, 19, 28, 47, 61, 75, 197, 742, 1104, 1537, 2208, 2580, 3684, 4788, 7385, 7647, 7909, 31331, 34285, 34348, 55604, 62662, 86935, 93993, 120284, 129106, 147640, 156146, 174680, 183186, 298320, 355419, 694280, 925993, 1084051, 7913837, 11436171, 33445755, 44121607, 129572008, 251133297, ...

Other bases
In base 2, there exists a method to construct all Keith numbers. 

The Keith numbers in base 12, written in base 12, are
11, 15, 1Ɛ, 22, 2ᘔ, 31, 33, 44, 49, 55, 62, 66, 77, 88, 93, 99, ᘔᘔ, ƐƐ, 125, 215, 24ᘔ, 405, 42ᘔ, 654, 80ᘔ, 8ᘔ3, ᘔ59, 1022, 1662, 2044, 3066, 4088, 4ᘔ1ᘔ, 4ᘔƐ1, 50ᘔᘔ, 8538, Ɛ18Ɛ, 17256, 18671, 24ᘔ78, 4718Ɛ, 517Ɛᘔ, 157617, 1ᘔ265ᘔ, 5ᘔ4074, 5ᘔƐ140, 6Ɛ1449, 6Ɛ8515, ...
where ᘔ represents 10 and Ɛ represents 11.

Keith clusters
A Keith cluster is a related set of Keith numbers such that one is a multiple of another. These are possibly the only three examples of a Keith cluster in base 10.

Programming example
The example below implements the sequence defined above in Python to determine if a number in a particular base is a Keith number:

def is_repfigit(x: int, b: int) -> bool:
    """Determine if a number in a particular base is a Keith number."""
    if x == 0:
        return True

    sequence = []
    y = x

    while y > 0:
        sequence.append(y % b)
        y = y // b

    digit_count = len(sequence)
    sequence.reverse()

    while sequence[len(sequence) - 1] < x:
        n = 0
        for i in range(0, digit_count):
            n = n + sequence[len(sequence) - digit_count + i]
        sequence.append(n)

    return (sequence[len(sequence) - 1] == x)

See also
 Arithmetic dynamics
 Fibonacci number
 Linear recurrence relation

References

Arithmetic dynamics
Base-dependent integer sequences
Fibonacci numbers
Recurrence relations